The men's 200 metres sprint event at the 1936 Olympic Games took place between August 4 and August 5. There were 44 athletes from 22 nations competing. The maximum number of athletes per nation had been set at 3 since the 1930 Olympic Congress. The final was won by African American Jesse Owens, with silver going to Mack Robinson (brother of baseball's Jackie). Owens thus reached 3 gold medals in 1936 (along with the 100 metres and long jump), with the sprint relay still to come. The Netherlands earned its first medal in the men's 200 metres with Tinus Osendarp's bronze.

Background

This was the ninth appearance of the event, which was not held at the first Olympics in 1896 but has been on the program ever since. None of the six finalists from the 1932 Games returned. Jesse Owens was the favorite coming into the Games. He had already won both the 100 metres and the long jump in Berlin.

Liechtenstein made its debut in the event. The United States made its ninth appearance, the only nation to have competed at each edition of the 200 metres to date.

Competition format

The competition used the four round format introduced in 1920: heats, quarterfinals, semifinals, and a final. There were 8 heats of between 4 and 6 runners each, with the top 3 men in each advancing to the quarterfinals. The quarterfinals consisted of 4 heats of 6 athletes each; the 3 fastest men in each heat advanced to the semifinals. There were 2 semifinals, each with 6 runners. Again, the top 3 athletes advanced. The final had 6 runners. The races were run on a now-standard 400 metre track.

Records

Prior to this competition, the existing world and Olympic records were as follows:

*On straightaway. No world record existed for running on a curve.

Jesse Owens set a new Olympic record in the third heat, running in 21.1 seconds. He repeated that performance in the third quarterfinal. Mack Robinson matched Owens' new record in the first semifinal, and again in the final—but Owens finished with a time of 20.7 seconds in the final to lower the Olympic record and set an unofficial world record for curved-track running.

Schedule

Results

Heats

The fastest three runners in each of the eight heats advanced to the quarterfinal round.

Heat 1

Heat 2

Heat 3

Heat 4

Heat 5

Heat 6

Heat 7

Heat 8

Quarterfinals

The fastest three runners in each of the four heats advanced to the semifinal round.

Quarterfinal 1

Quarterfinal 2

Quarterfinal 3

Quarterfinal 4

Semifinals

The fastest three runners in each of the two heats advanced to the final round.

Semifinal 1

Semifinal 2

Final

References

Athletics at the 1936 Summer Olympics
200 metres at the Olympics
Men's events at the 1936 Summer Olympics